Dmitry Vladimirovich Sinitzyn (born October 29, 1973 in Yekaterinburg) is a Russian nordic combined athlete who competed from 1997 to 2002. He won two bronze medals at the 1999 FIS Nordic World Ski Championships in Ramsau (15 km individual and 4 x 5 km team).

Sinitzyn also earned three individual career victories in 1997 (two individual, one sprint).

External links

Russian male Nordic combined skiers
1973 births
Living people
Nordic combined skiers at the 1998 Winter Olympics
Olympic Nordic combined skiers of Russia
FIS Nordic World Ski Championships medalists in Nordic combined